Philip Kouwen (18 June 1922, in Rotterdam – 17 December 2002, in Warnsveld) was a Dutch artist notable for his graphic works, mostly landscapes and cityscapes which used grey color.

Kouwen graduated from the Rotterdam Academy of Art. Rotterdam was badly damaged during World War II, and after the war, in 1949, Kouwen with a group of his former classmates moved to Dordrecht, where it was easier to rent an atelier. In Dordrecht, he became a member of the Pictura Art Society, and between 1949 and 1961 he had his atelier at Pictura. From 1956, he was teaching at the Academy of Art and Industry in Enschede.

Kouwen started his career as a painter, but since the end of the 1950s, he also started working as a graphics designer, which shifted his interests to graphics, in particular, drawing. He started creating cityscapes (most notably, of Dordrecht) and landscapes in the 1960s. Since the 1970s, he exclusively worked with black chalk. In 1984, Kouwen moved from Dordrecht to Warnsveld, and landscapes of Gelderland became his favorite topic, along with still-lifes.
 
Dordrechts Museum contains a collection of his works. A number of drawings were bought by the Rijksprentenkabinet in Amsterdam.

References

Dutch artists
Artists from Dordrecht
Artists from Rotterdam